Varvarino is a rural locality (a selo) in Krasnoselskoye Rural Settlement, Yuryev-Polsky District, Vladimir Oblast, Russia. The population was 22 as of 2010.

Geography 
Varvarino is located on the left bank of the Koloksha River, 10 km southeast of Yuryev-Polsky (the district's administrative centre) by road. Yeltsy is the nearest rural locality.

References 

Rural localities in Yuryev-Polsky District